The Mercedes-Benz OM 654 is a family of inline-four cylinder automobile diesel engines introduced by Mercedes-Benz in 2016. This is one of the most powerful 2-liter inline-4 cylinder diesel engines with a single twin-scroll turbocharger.

OM 654
The engine is a  turbo-diesel cast aluminum block in line four-cylinder with balancing shafts. It has a single turbo and cylinder walls are lined with slippery Nanoslide, an iron-carbon coating that cuts friction. Also, the engine consumes 13% less fuel than its predecessor. It is planned that it will feature across the entire Mercedes-Benz range of cars and vans. Both the 200d an 220d are mated to a 9 speed dual clutch transmission developed by Mercedes Benz.

Applications

OM 654q
It is a version of OM 654 placed transversely (quer). This makes it possible to mount this engine in smaller models of cars and front-wheel-drive vehicles.Mercedes-Benz OM 654q 4-cylinder diesel complies with Stage 2 RDE, certified to Euro 6d

OM 654 M

References

External links
The future of the diesel engine. OM 654 - More economical and powerful, more lightweight and compact
The new OM 654 four-cylinder diesel engine.

OM654
Diesel engines by model
Straight-four engines